Omurtag Pass (Omurtagov Prohod \o-mur-'ta-gov 'pro-hod\) is a 720 m high pass between Mount Bowles and Ticha Peak in Bowles Ridge, Livingston Island in the South Shetland Islands, Antarctica and is part of an overland route between the Wörner Gap area and upper Kaliakra Glacier.  The pass is named after Khan Omurtag of Bulgaria, 814-831 AD.

First crossed by Lyubomir Ivanov and Doychin Vasilev from Camp Academia on 24 December 2004.

Location

Maps
 L.L. Ivanov et al. Antarctica: Livingston Island and Greenwich Island, South Shetland Islands. Scale 1:100000 topographic map. Sofia: Antarctic Place-names Commission of Bulgaria, 2005.
 Antarctic Digital Database (ADD). Scale 1:250000 topographic map of Antarctica. Scientific Committee on Antarctic Research (SCAR). Since 1993, regularly upgraded and updated.
 L.L. Ivanov. Antarctica: Livingston Island and Smith Island. Scale 1:100000 topographic map. Manfred Wörner Foundation, 2017. 
 A. Kamburov and L. Ivanov. Bowles Ridge and Central Tangra Mountains: Livingston Island, Antarctica. Scale 1:25000 map. Sofia: Manfred Wörner Foundation, 2023.

References
 Omurtag Pass. SCAR Composite Antarctic Gazetteer
 Bulgarian Antarctic Gazetteer. Antarctic Place-names Commission. (details in Bulgarian, basic data in English)

External links
 Omurtag Pass. Copernix satellite image

Mountain passes of Livingston Island